Ion Lică Panait (5 March 1924 – 18 August 1981) was a Romanian footballer who played as a right back.

International career
Ion Panait played one game at international level for Romania, in a 1958 World Cup qualification match against Yugoslavia which ended with a 2–0 loss.

Notes

References

External links

Ion Panait at Labtof.ro

1934 births
1981 deaths
Romanian footballers
Romania international footballers
Association football defenders
Liga I players
Olympia București players
FC Carmen București players
FC Steaua București players
CSM Jiul Petroșani players
Footballers from Bucharest